James Mowat (October 6, 1889 – October 26, 1962) was a Scottish-born merchant and political figure in British Columbia. He represented Alberni in the Legislative Assembly of British Columbia from 1941 to 1952 as a Liberal member of the coalition government. In the 1949 election we has elected as an independent because he lost the nomination for the party in his riding.

He was born on the Island of Hoy at Garson (Farm) Orkney Islands, the son of Thomas Robertson Mowat and Jean McKid Sutherland, and was educated there. Mowat came to Canada in 1910. In 1918, he married Isabella Margaret Davidson. Mowat served during World War I.  Mowat was defeated when he ran for reelection in 1952 as a Liberal. He died in 1962 of a cerebral hemorrhage.

References 

1889 births
British Columbia Liberal Party MLAs
1962 deaths
British emigrants to Canada